Malekhu (मलेखु) is a small town situated in Dhading district, halfway between Kathmandu and Narayangadh. It is situated in the bank of Trishuli River. It is famous for various types of fish species and its product. Malekhu is widely popular for adventurous sports such as rafting, trekking, kayaking and so on. It is one of the most exciting and dangerous rafting sites of the world. It is situated near by the famous Manakamana Temple which is at the distance of 30 km from the town. It is also famous for hiking. The main attraction of Malekhu also includes the geological researches and geological minerals present there. International as well as national Geology students get to there for geological studies, the availability of different minerals is also gathered in small area in there. The larger portion of the population consists mostly of Tripathis, Silwals and Kadels.

References

Populated places in Dhading District